Five Senses is the second extended play from South Korean boy band Pentagon. It was released on December 7, 2016, by Cube Entertainment. The album consists of five tracks, including the title track, "Can You Feel It".

Background and release 
On November 24, 2016, Pentagon announced the title and release date of their second mini-album through their official SNS accounts. The album was highlighted in particular due to the short time between its release and the group's first mini-album Pentagon, which was released less than two months prior. The next day, they released a time schedule of the upcoming comeback. Group photos were posted on November 28 and 29. The tracklist was published on the November 30, followed by an audio snippet of the EP on December 2. On December 3, they released a teaser for the title track "Can You Feel It" with a video of the members participating in the "Mannequin Challenge". The video, which was not included in the comeback schedule, showcases the members motionless while displaying snippets of the choreography. They released a music video teaser for "Can You Feel It" on December 5. The group first unveiled the song at their first solo concert "Tentastic Vol. 1 - Love" on December 6. The same day, a media showcase was held to commemorate the release of the mini-album at Yes24 Live Hall in Gwangjin-gu, Seoul. The video was released on December 7 alongside the album.

On January 18, 2017, a music video teaser for "Pretty Pretty" was released. The music video, featuring I.O.I's Chungha, was released on January 22.

Track listing

Charts

Certifications and sales

References

2016 EPs
Cube Entertainment EPs
Pentagon (South Korean band) EPs
Kakao M EPs
Korean-language albums
Korean-language EPs